Douglas R. Groothuis (born January 3, 1957) is professor of philosophy at Denver Seminary. Groothuis was a campus pastor for twelve years prior to obtaining a position as an associate professor of philosophy of religion and ethics at Denver Seminary in 1993. He was educated at the University of Wisconsin–Madison and the University of Oregon. He was married to Rebecca Merrill Groothuis until her death on July 6, 2018.

Career
During the late 1980s Groothuis emerged as a younger voice in evangelicalism with two books that described and analyzed New Age spirituality: Unmasking the New Age and Confronting the New Age. In subsequent books he pursued specific topics in New Age spirituality such as claims that Jesus spent his adolescent years studying among Hindu and Buddhist teachers in India and Tibet in Revealing the New Age Jesus. The phenomena of near-death experiences and the claims of Betty Eadie about the afterlife were the subject of his analysis in Deceived by the Light.

In the 1990s, Groothuis began to write about the cultural shifts associated with postmodern philosophy in his book Truth Decay, as well as to formulate responses to those shifts via Christian apologetics. He was also interested in human behavior and belief associated with the use of the Internet, and wrote of his theological concerns in The Soul in Cyberspace. His interests in philosophy have also led him to write on topics like Immanuel Kant's epistemology, the rationality of theism, and book-length treatments of the philosophical ideas and methods of Blaise Pascal and Jesus. In 2011, Groothuis published a comprehensive textbook on Christian apologetics.

In his teaching career at Denver Seminary, he has taught graduate courses in Christian Apologetics, Problems in Apologetics, Issues in Philosophy of Religion, Christian Ethics and Modern Culture, and Religious Pluralism, among many others. He is a member of the Society of Christian Philosophers and the Evangelical Philosophical Society, has published sixteen books and contributed to many others, and has written numerous articles, book reviews, and editorials. Articles have appeared in periodicals such as Christianity Today, the Journal of the Evangelical Theological Society, Philosophia Christi, and Moody Monthly.

Bibliography
 Christianity That Counts (Grand Rapids: Baker, 1994). 
 Confronting the New Age (Downers Grove: InterVarsity Press, 1988). 
 Deceived by the Light (Eugene: Harvest House, 1995). 
 On Jesus (South Melbourne and Belmont: Thomson/Wadsworth, 2003). 
 On Pascal (South Melbourne and Belmont: Thomson/Wadsworth, 2003). 
 Revealing the New Age Jesus (Downers Grove: InterVarsity Press, 1990). 
 The Soul in Cyberspace (Grand Rapids: Baker, 1997). 
 Truth Decay (Downers Grove: InterVarsity Press, 2000). 
 Unmasking the New Age (Downers Grove: InterVarsity Press, 1986). 
 In Defense of Natural Theology: A Post-Humean Assessment, co-edited with James F. Sennett (Downers Grove: InterVarsity Press, 2005). 
 Jesus in an Age of Controversy (Wipf & Stock, 2002).  
 Christian Apologetics: A Comprehensive Case for Biblical Faith (InterVarsity Press, 2011). 
 Philosophy in Seven Sentences: A Small Introduction to a Vast Topic (InterVarsity Press, 2016). 
 Walking Through Twilight: A Wife's Illness—A Philosopher's Lament (InterVarsity Press, 2017). 
 I Love You to the Stars: When Grandma Forgets, Love Remembers (Kregel Publications, 2020), co-authored with Crystal Bowman. 
 Fire in the Streets: How You Can Confidently Respond to Incendiary Cultural Topics (Salem Books, 2022). 
 The Knowledge of God in the World and the Word: An Introduction to Classical Apologetics (Zondervan Academic, 2022), co-authored with Andrew I. Shepardson.

References

External links

The Constructive Curmudgeon Groothuis' blog
Author's page at Access Research Network
Apologetic Lectures Groothuis' lectures on apologetics (mp3 format)

1957 births
Living people
20th-century American philosophers
20th-century American theologians
20th-century Protestant theologians
21st-century American non-fiction writers
21st-century American philosophers
21st-century American theologians
21st-century Protestant theologians
American Christian theologians
American evangelicals
Christian apologists
New Age
Protestant philosophers
Analytic theologians